Agelasta luzonica is a species of beetle in the family Cerambycidae. It was described by Stephan von Breuning in 1937. It is known from the Philippines.

References

luzonica
Beetles described in 1937